Versions is an album by Thievery Corporation, released in May 2006. The album consists of a collection of rare remixes done by Thievery Corporation, largely of other artists' material, and the original Thievery Corporation track, "Originality".

Track listing
"Tarana" by Ustad Sultan Khan – 4:40 (originally released in 1976)
"Habaños Days" by Damian Draghici – 4:22 (originally released in 2004)
"This Is Not a Love Song" by Nouvelle Vague – 4:33 (originally released in 2004)
"Beloved" by Anoushka Shankar – 4:23 (originally released in 2005)
"Who Needs Forever" by Astrud Gilberto – 4:12 (originally released in 1966)
"Desert" by Emilie Simon – 3:13 (originally released in 2002)
"Lemon Tree" by Herb Alpert – 3:38 (originally released in 1965)
"Originality" featuring Sister Nancy – 4:08 (previously unreleased)
"In Love" by Fear of Pop – 4:39 (originally released in 1998)
"The Girl's Insane" by The Januaries – 4:27 (originally released in 2000)
"Strange Days" by The Doors – 4:23 (originally released in 1967)
"Revolution Solution" (TC Remix) – 3:50 (previously unreleased but original song released in 2004)
"Shiva" (TC Remix) – 4:49 (previously unreleased but original song released in 2004)
"Khalghi Stomp" by Transglobal Underground – 3:54 (originally released in 2004)
"Angels" by Wax Poetic featuring Norah Jones – 4:39 (originally released in 2003)
"Nothing to Lose" by Isabelle Antena – 2:56 (originally released in 2004)
"Cada Beijo" by Bebel Gilberto – 4:19 (originally released in 2004)
"Dirty Little Secret" by Sarah McLachlan – 4:52 (originally released in 2003)

Charts

References

2006 albums
Thievery Corporation albums
4AD albums